Kozlovsky (masculine), Kozlovskaya (feminine), or Kozlovskoye (neuter) may refer to:

Kozlovsky (surname) (Kozlovskaya), a Russian last name
4944 Kozlovskij, a main-belt asteroid

Places in Russia
 Kozlovsky (rural locality) (Kozlovskaya, Kozlovskoye), multiple rural localities
 Kozlovskaya, Arkhangelsk Oblast
 Kozlovsky, Republic of Bashkortostan
 Kozlovsky, Talovsky District, Voronezh Oblast
 Kozlovsky District, a district in the Chuvash Republic
 Kozlovskoye Urban Settlement, composed of Kozlovka and three rural localities in Kozlovsky District

See also
Kozlovka (disambiguation), several inhabited localities in Russia
Kozłowski, a surname